Douglas Bruce Kell  (born 7 April 1953) is a British biochemist and Research Professor of Systems Biology in the Institute of Systems, Molecular and Integrative Biology at the University of Liverpool, and Chief Scientific Officer of Epoch Biodesign Ltd. He was previously at the School of Chemistry at the University of Manchester, based in the Manchester Institute of Biotechnology (MIB). He founded and led the Manchester Centre for Integrative Systems Biology. He served as chief executive officer (CEO) of the Biotechnology and Biological Sciences Research Council (BBSRC) from 2008 to 2013.

Education
Kell was educated at Hydneye House in Sussex, Bradfield College in Berkshire (where he was Top Scholar) and St John's College, Oxford. He graduated from the University of Oxford with a Bachelor of Arts degree in Biochemistry in 1975 (with a Distinction in Chemical Pharmacology) followed by a Doctor of Philosophy in 1978 with a thesis on the Bioenergetics of Paracoccus denitrificans, supervised by Stuart Ferguson and Philip John.

From 1978 to 2002 he worked at Aberystwyth University, moving to the University of Manchester Institute of Science and Technology (UMIST) in 2002 as an Engineering and Physical Sciences Research Council (EPSRC)/Royal Society of Chemistry (RSC) Research Chair in Bioanalytical Sciences. (UMIST merged with the Victoria University of Manchester in 2004, to become The University of Manchester.) He moved to the University of Liverpool (which was the world's first University to have a Department of Biochemistry) in 2018.

Research and career
Kell's primary research interests are in systems biology, synthetic biology and computational biology. He has also been heavily involved in the development of multivariate scientific instrumentation and the attendant machine learning software (his first paper on artificial neural networks was in 1992). He has written extensively on the role of microbes as agents of supposedly 'non-communicable', chronic infectious diseases. His publications are mostly open access and are very widely cited, with an H-index at Google Scholar in excess of 120. According to Google Scholar his most cited peer-reviewed research papers are in functional genomics, metabolomics and the yeast genome. He has also been involved in research to create a robot scientist in collaboration with Ross King, Stephen Muggleton and Steve Oliver, as well as several projects in systems biology. He is heavily involved in the study of membrane transporters, and their necessary involvement in the transmembrane uptake of pharmaceutical drugs. He tends to choose scientific problems in which the prevailing orthodoxy is clearly incorrect. To this end, he has recently returned to the study of bioenergetics, summarising the detailed evidence against the prevailing wisdom of chemiosmotic coupling in oxidative and photosynthetic phosphorylation, replacing it with a protet-based model.

With his collaborator Resia Pretorius, Kell discovered the amyloidogenic clotting of blood, involving the amyloidogenic self-assembly of the clotting protein fibrin into highly stable beta-sheets that — unlike regular clots — are resistant to plasmin, the enzyme responsible for breaking up clots (fibrinolysis). They report that such amyloidogenic clotting appears to be mostly caused by infectious agents, even in supposedly non-infectious diseases. Kell and Pretorius report that such fibrin amyloid microclots (fibrinaloids) seem to be of major significance in long COVID.

In 1988, he was a Founding Director of Aber Instruments, based at Aberystwyth Science Park (originally at the Centre for Alternative Technology, Machynlleth, Wales). In 2019 he was a Founding Director with Jacob Nathan of Mellizyme Ltd, now Epoch Biodesign. He cofounded PhenUTest Ltd in 2021. He is an Associated Scientific Director of the Centre for Biosustainability at the Technical University of Denmark, where he runs the  Flux Optimisation and Bioanalytics Group.

Kell's research has been funded by the EU, the BBSRC, the Medical Research Council (MRC) and the Engineering and Physical Sciences Research Council (EPSRC). His former doctoral students and postdoctoral researchers include Pedro Pedrosa Mendes. His monograph Belief: the baggage behind our being was published in 2018.

Awards and honours
Kell was appointed Commander of the Order of the British Empire (CBE) in the 2014 New Year Honours, for services to science and research. Kell is also a Fellow of the Learned Society of Wales (FLSW), a Fellow of the Royal Society of Biology (FRSB) and a Fellow of the American Association for the Advancement of Science (FAAS).

References

|-

Academics of the University of Manchester
Alumni of Aberystwyth University
Living people
Alumni of St John's College, Oxford
Commanders of the Order of the British Empire
Fellows of the Learned Society of Wales
Fellows of the Royal Society of Biology
Fellows of the American Association for the Advancement of Science
British biochemists
People educated at Bradfield College
1953 births
Academics of the University of Liverpool